Alverno College is a private Roman Catholic women's college in Milwaukee, Wisconsin.

History
Chartered in 1887 as St. Joseph's Normal School, Alverno became Alverno Teachers College in 1936. It adopted its current name in 1946.

Academics
Alverno offers undergraduate programs and a coeducational Master of Arts program for teachers and business professionals, the Alverno MBA, and a Master of Science in nursing. The Weekend College was opened in 1977 as the first alternative time-frame program in Milwaukee to serve working women in the Milwaukee area. It is still primarily a women's college. The baccalaureate degree programs, residences, etc. are still open only to women; graduate degree programs are open to both women and men.

Alverno does not use a letter or number system for grading, but instead uses an abilities based curriculum and narrative evaluation.

Athletics 
Alverno College teams participate as a member of the National Collegiate Athletic Association's Division III. The Inferno are a member of the Northern Athletics Conference (NAC). Alverno was also a member of the Lake Michigan Conference until the spring of 2006. Women's sports include basketball, cross country, soccer, softball, tennis and volleyball. Boxing was added as a club sport in 2016, and the team competes as part of the United States Intercollegiate Boxing Association; they have earned one individual championship as of 2019.

Alumni
Diane Drufenbrock, Roman Catholic nun and Socialist Party nominee for Vice President of the United States
Georgine Loacker, educator
Cree Myles, influencer, writer and organizer
Toni Palermo, educator and baseball player
Sister Joel Read, Roman Catholic nun and educator
Marilyn Shrude, composer
Marion Verhaalen, composer and musicologist

Faculty
Carole Barrowman, English professor and author

References

External links
 Official website

 
Association of Catholic Colleges and Universities
Educational institutions established in 1887
Universities and colleges in Milwaukee
Women's universities and colleges in the United States
1887 establishments in Wisconsin
Catholic universities and colleges in Wisconsin
Roman Catholic Archdiocese of Milwaukee
Articles containing video clips